The Individuals are a Chicago based Rap/Hip hop/Reggae band.  Ando Tha Don, Big Lou, Raw Bizness, and T.C.O. are the current members of what started as a six-member act.  Their record label is Rule the World Records.

The band's music was used in the second and third seasons of the Showtime series Weeds, leading to the band performing the show's theme song "Little Boxes" for a third-season episode.

The Individuals are part of the 420 sub culture, and they have won eleven Marijuana Music Awards.

Most recently, The Individuals were the featured subject of an article in End Online Misogyny  for their Misogynistic approach to strong women on Twitter.

Discography
 Something To Smoke To (2003)
 Something To Smoke To 2 (2006)

Sources

External links
 The Individuals official site at Rule the World Records.
  End Online Misogyny

American hip hop groups
Musical groups from Chicago
Cannabis music
Musical quartets